Henry Haldeman may refer to:

 H. R. Haldeman (Harry Robbins Haldeman, 1926–1993), American political aide and businessman
 Henry Winfield Haldeman (1848–1905)